Evan Rees (1 January 1850 – 19 March 1923), known by the bardic name Dyfed, was a Calvinistic Methodist minister, poet, and Archdruid of the National Eisteddfod of Wales.

Life
Rees was born at Puncheston, Pembrokeshire, the son of James and Eunice Rees; they moved to Aberdare when he was a child and he began working in the local colliery at the age of only eight.  Having moved to Cardiff, he became a Calvinistic Methodist minister at the age of 23 and gained his first National Eisteddfod victory in 1881.

In 1893, Rees participated in the Eisteddfod that was held as part of the World Columbian Exposition in Chicago, Illinois, winning the Bardic Chair and a $500 prize for a 2,000 line awdl on the set subject Iesu o Nazareth ("Jesus of Nazareth").

Rees went on to become the Archdruid of the Gorsedd Cymru and to announce the posthumous victory of Hedd Wyn at the famous 1917 "Eisteddfod of the Black Chair" in Birkenhead.

Works
 Caniadau Dyfedfab 
 Gwlad yr Addewid a Iesu o Nazareth (1900) 
 Gwaith Barddonol Dyfed (1903–1907) 
 Oriau gydag Islwyn (1901) 
 Emynau Dyfed (1924, posthumous)

References

Welsh Eisteddfod archdruids
1850 births
1923 deaths
Calvinist and Reformed poets
Calvinist pacifists
Chaired bards